Ngala, or Sogap, is one of the Ndu languages of Sepik River region of northern Papua New Guinea. It is spoken in the single village of Swagap in Ambunti Rural LLG of East Sepik Province.

References

Languages of East Sepik Province
Ndu languages